London Buses route 55 is a Transport for London contracted bus route in London, England. Running between Walthamstow bus station and Oxford Circus, it is operated by Stagecoach London.

History

The route number 55 came from tram 55, replaced by trolleybus 555, which had run between Old Street and Hackney.

In 1990, the section of the route that linked Leyton and Oxford Circus was withdrawn. It was reinstated in 1997 after a campaign by Waltham Forest residents.

Stagecoach London successfully retained route 55 with a new contract starting on 27 February 2010 and a further contract starting on 28 February 2015.

New Routemasters were introduced on 28 February 2015. The rear platform remains closed at all times except for when the bus is at bus stops. On 12 October 2019, route 55 was extended to Walthamstow bus station after the withdrawal of route 48.

In 2021, the maximum frequency of the service was reduced from 11 buses per hour to 9.

References

External links

Bus routes in London
Transport in the City of Westminster
Transport in the London Borough of Camden
Transport in the London Borough of Islington
Transport in the London Borough of Hackney
Transport in the London Borough of Tower Hamlets
Transport in the London Borough of Waltham Forest